Lt.-Colonel Colborne Powell Meredith (September 15, 1874 – January 29, 1967) was a Canadian architect.

Biography
Colborne Meredith was born in St. Andrews, New Brunswick on September 15, 1874, the son of Edmund Allen Meredith, CMG. He studied architecture at the University of Toronto in the early 1890s. He married Alden Griffien in September 1901.

He was Commissioner of the Ottawa Improvement Commission (1908), President of the Ontario Architects Association (1912), and Councillor of the Royal Architectural Institute of Canada. He designed many of the principal buildings and residences in Ottawa, including the Château Laurier Hotel, as well as a number of schools and convents throughout Canada. Meredith chaired the conference of the Ontario Association of Architects in Ottawa 1911 and also chaired the 1912 Royal Architectural Institute of Canada convention in Ottawa.

Meredith joined the Militia in 1892, and from 1915 to 1918 was camp engineer and later camp commandant of Camp Petawawa. From 1925 to 1934 he served as General-Secretary to the League of Nations Society in Canada.

He died at his home in Ottawa on January 29, 1967.

Architectural works 
 Rockcliffe Park, Residence For Miss Annie Mcleod-Clark, Lisgar Road, 1908
 Wurtemberg Street, Residence For F.C. Trench O'hara, 1908
 Wilbrod Street, At Augusta Street, Residence For John S. Ewart, 1908
 Belleville, Ont., St. Michael's Roman Catholic Separate School, Church Street, 1908
 Pembroke, Ont., Rectory For Holy Trinity Anglican Church, 1909
 Pembroke, Ont., Munro Block, Pembroke Street West Near Albert Street, C. 1910
 Pembroke, Ont., Dunlop & Co. Warehouse, Pembroke Street West Near Moffat Street, C. 1910
 Laurier Avenue West, Near Elgin Street, Residence For Dr. John Robertson, 1909–10
 The Driveway, At Delaware Avenue, Residence For Joseph A. Thibodeau, 1909–10
 Fotheringham & Popham Co., Queen Street, Warehouse, 1909–10
 Carling Building, For The Murphy-Gamble Department Store, Sparks Street, 1909–10)
 Clemow Avenue, Residence For George A. Crain, 1910
 Blackburn & Bryson, Bank Street Near Sparks Street, 1910
 Salisbury Avenue, Residence For Hon. Sidney Fisher, 1910
 Goulburn Avenue, Residence For Justice Lyman P. Duff, 1910–11
 Queen Street, Warehouse For The Dominion Analyst, 1910)
 Renfrew, Ont., Roman Catholic Separate School, And Addition To Roman Catholic Convent, 1911
 Morewood, Ont., Continuation School, 1911
 Hugh M. Carson Co., Sparks Street Near Lyon Street, Addition, 1911
 Carling Avenue, Residence For Ernest M. Barrett, 1911
 Marlborough Avenue, Residence For T. D'arcy Mcgee, 1911
 Range Road, Residence For The Architect, 1911
 Quebec City, Que., Residence For Georges A. Parent, Grand Allee, 1912
 Parish Hall, For The Roman Catholic Episcopal Corp., 1912
 Marlborough Avenue, Residence For Thomas A. Beament, 1912
 Laurier Avenue East, Residence For Dr. Frederick W.C. Mohr, 1913
 York Street, Warehouse For S.J. Major & Co., 1913
 Carling Building, Bank Street, For F.W. Carling, 1913
 Albert Street, Business Block For Mrs. Cowie, 1913
 University Of Ottawa, Laurier Avenue At Cumberland Street, Additions, 1914
 Ottawa Canoe Club, A Clubhouse On The Ottawa River At Rockcliffe, 1914
 Norlite Building, Wellington Street, C. 1916 (With Richards & Abra)
 Range Road, Residence For The Architect, C. 1920
 Meredith & Belfrey
 Lambton Avenue, Residence For Charles B. Topp, C. 1921
 Lambton Avenue, Residence For A. Gladstone Ghent, C. 1921
 Rideau Terrace, Residence For William D. Headley, C. 1921
 Rockcliffe Way, Residence For Joseph Stotesbury, C. 1921
 Rockcliffe Way, Residence For Archibald N. Fraser, C. 1921

References 

University of Toronto alumni
Canadian architects
1874 births
1967 deaths
People from Saint Andrews, New Brunswick